Magister is Latin for "master" or "teacher". It may refer to:

Positions and titles
 Magister degree, an academic degree
 Magister equitum, or Master of the Horse
 Magister militum, a master of the soldiers
 Magister officiorum (master of offices), a civilian post of the Roman Empire
 Magister palatii (Master of the Sacred Palace), a Roman Catholic curial position
 Magister, praefectus curiae, a house-master in medieval Europe

Aircraft
 Fouga Magister, a French training aircraft
 Miles Magister, a British training aircraft

Biology
 Neotoma magister, a species of pack rat
 Berryteuthis magister, a species of squid
 Metacarcinus magister, the Dungeness crab
 Sceloporus magister, a species of spiny lizard

People
 Dositheus Magister, 4th-century Roman scholar
 Thomas Magister, 14th-century Byzantine monk and scholar
 Magister Wigbold, 14th-century German pirate

Other
 Magister, a font designed by Aldo Novarese (1966)
 The Magister, a sourcebook for the Forgotten Realms setting of the Dungeons & Dragons RPG
 Magister (application), a Dutch school-administration application
 Master (software), originally Magister, the pseudonym of the Go software AlphaGo